Surovikinsky District is an administrative district (raion), one of the thirty-three in Volgograd Oblast, Russia. As a municipal division, it is incorporated as Surovikinsky Municipal District. It is located in the southwest of the oblast. Its administrative center is the town of Surovikino. Population:  38,956 (2002 Census);  The population of Surovikino accounts for 55.3% of the district's total population.

References

Notes

Sources

Districts of Volgograd Oblast